Tim Murphy is an American politician. He served as a Democratic member for the 115th district of the Florida House of Representatives.

Life and career 
Murphy is a former prosecutor.

In 1982, Murphy was elected to represent the 115th district of the Florida House of Representatives, succeeding Jim Brodie. He served until 1984, when he was succeeded by Javier Souto.

References 

Living people
Year of birth missing (living people)
Place of birth missing (living people)
Democratic Party members of the Florida House of Representatives
21st-century American politicians